It's Not My Business (French: C'est pas moi, c'est l'autre) is a 1962 French comedy film directed by Jean Boyer and starring Fernand Raynaud, Jean Poiret and Micheline Dax.

The film's sets were designed by the art director Robert Giordani.

Cast
 Fernand Raynaud as Fernand Raynaud/Gaspard
 Jean Poiret as Jean Duroc
 Micheline Dax as Paula
 Geneviève Kervine as Monique
 Henri Virlojeux as Pierjan
 Robert Piquet as Le ténor
 Gélou as Miss Betty, la twisteuse 
 Michel Seldow as L'illusionniste	
 Max Elloy as L'huissier
 Max Montavon as Ludovic Morin, le pianiste et le batteur de la tournée
 Jean Droze as Le régisseur de la tournée
 Lucien Guervil as Le patron de l'hôtel du cheval blanc
 Jean Balthasar as Le chauffeur de car 
 Fred Pasquali as L'imprésario

References

Bibliography 
 Alfred Krawc. International Directory of Cinematographers, Set- and Costume Designers in Film: France (from the beginnings to 1980). Saur, 1983.

External links 
 

1962 films
French comedy films
1962 comedy films
1960s French-language films
Films directed by Jean Boyer
1960s French films